The Fête de la Concorde was a festival held at the Champ-de-Mars in Paris, France.

The architect Henri Labrouste and the painter Pierre-Victor Galland contributed to the decoration of the festival in 1848.

References 

Festivals in Paris
1848 in France
History of Paris